Shirley Ann (née Kreis) Craft (August 18, 1927 – May 8, 2010) was an American educator and politician.

Craft graduated from University of Montana and Colorado State University with degrees in business. She taught school in Ketchikan, Alaska and then served as principal of Joy Elementary School in Fairbanks, Alaska. In 1991, Craft was appointed to the Alaska Senate replacing Bettye Fahrenkamp who died in office. Craft served until 1993 and did not seek re-election. Craft died from heart trouble in Fairbanks, Alaska.

Notes

External links

1927 births
2010 deaths
Politicians from Fairbanks, Alaska
Colorado State University alumni
University of Montana alumni
Educators from Alaska
American women educators
Women state legislators in Alaska
Alaska state senators
21st-century American women